Kara Moser McCoy (15 August 1898 – 17 January 2005) was an Australian World War I veteran who was the last known female veteran of the Australian armed forces. She was born in England, and enlisted underage in 1914. She served as a nurse for the Australian and New Zealand Army Corps.

After the war she worked in France with the Imperial War Graves Commission.

Death 
She died in Sebastopol, California.

References
 http://www.worldwar1.com/tgws/smtw0205.htm

1898 births
2005 deaths
Australian centenarians
Australian military personnel of World War I
Australian women of World War I
Australian nurses
Australian women nurses
Women centenarians
British emigrants to Australia